Surinamese Americans are Americans of Surinamese descent. According to answers provided to an open-ended question included in the 2000 census, 2,833 people said that their ancestry or ethnic origin was Surinamese.

History 
The Surinamese community in United States has existed since at least 1975. For much of the twentieth century, many Surinamese immigrants in the U.S., moved there through a permanent visa, which enabled them to acquire American citizenship. However, it was becoming easier to immigrate into the US because of the open door policy Americans had. Some of these people were political refugees that fled the Bouterse regime. 

There are many reasons for which Surinamese emigrate to United States. Although many Surinamese migrate to the United States in order to escape poverty, also there are many Surinamese people who have migrated for work, study and tourism. Thus, many Surinamese who traveled to the USA with tourist purposes to study at their universities, definitely settled here. Most Surinamese that migrated to cities in the U.S. after traveling to them were people of middle and low class who arrived between the late 80s and early 90s. Also the existence of families already residents in some American cities boosted the emigration of many Surinamese to those places.

Demography 
Most of the Surinamense organizations estimate that about of 10,000-15,000 Surinamese living through the United States.  Most Surinamese Americans live in South Florida and New York City. Other places where many Surinamese live are Washington, Atlanta (Georgia), California (primarily San Francisco) and others cities of Florida. However, according most associations, they are found all over the country. Most Surinamese are attracted to places similar to their land, from the point of view of the architecture of the houses and the presentation of the flora. For that reason, the highest concentrations of Surinamese are in Florida (Miami, Orlando, Fort Lauderdale, Fort Myers, Sarasota and Tampa). Most of Surinamese living in United States are of Chinese, East Indian, Creole, and mixed descent. However, all other ethnicities and races in Suriname are also represented in the U.S. So, many Surinamese of United States are also white (included people of Dutch descent) and people of Javanese, Amerindian,  and Maroon origins. This racially variety in the Surinamese community is displayed specially in New York. The Surinamese community has many problems, such as lack of unity and mistrust. The Surinamese community in New York is more tightly-knit than the Surinamese community in Florida.

Organizations 
Most organizations try to maintain the identity and Surinamese cultures, particularly the Indian, Creole, and Javanese, developing various activities and events in the year. Seven of the eight organizations are in Miami (Fayalobi, the only organization situated outside Miami, is in Tampa). Some Surinamese organizations in United States are the Surinamese Moravian Fellowship of Miami, Surjawa, the Organization of Surinamese people in Miami (OSIM), the Surinamese American Network Incorporation (SANI), Fayalobi, the Surinam Heritage Foundation and Heri Heri; all of them are within Florida.

On the other hand, the Surinamese church tries to promote social union based on the Christian religion and in performing of social events. A Surinamese religious association in United States is the Surinamese Moravian Church, in Miami.

Notable people
Sergiño Dest, soccer player
Otto Huiswoud, political activist
Ryan Leslie, singer
Robert Van Lierop, lawyer, film director, diplomat, activist and writer
Maurice Ligeon, soccer player
Jacques Judah Lyons, rabbi
 Vinoodh Matadin - fashion photographer
Jan Ernst Matzeliger, inventor
Felipe Enrique Neri, Baron de Bastrop, businessman and land owner
Yosh Nijman, American football player
Jimmy Smits, actor
DJ Sun, musician
 Corliss Waitman

References

External links 
 Fayalobi - official page
 Suriname Moravian Fellowship, Corp.

 
Caribbean American
Surinamese diaspora